The Cavaliers may refer to:

The Cavaliers Drum and Bugle Corps
J. Frank Wilson and the Cavaliers
The Sensations, a group initially known as The Cavaliers
Cleveland Cavaliers, an NBA Basketball Team

See also
Cavalier, a supporter of the Royalist cause during the Wars of the Three Kingdoms
Cavalier (disambiguation)